When the Heath Dreams at Night is a 1952 West German drama film directed by Paul Martin and starring Rudolf Prack, Viktor Staal and Margot Trooger. It was shot in the Göttingen Studios and on Lüneburg Heath. The film's sets were designed by the art directors Carl Ludwig Kirmse and Walter Kutz.

Synopsis
A young man who works making safe unexploded Second World War bombs on Lüneburg Heath invites an old wartime comrade to stay with him. However problems ensue when the visitor falls in love with his fiancée.

Cast

References

Bibliography 
 Spicer, Andrew. Historical Dictionary of Film Noir. Scarecrow Press, 2010.

External links 
 

1952 films
1952 drama films
German drama films
West German films
1950s German-language films
Films directed by Paul Martin
Gloria Film films
German black-and-white films
1950s German films
Films shot at Göttingen Studios